Elgun Nebiyev (born 5 January 1997) is an Azerbaijani footballer who plays as a winger for Limanovia.

Club career
On 17 December 2016, Nabiyev made his debut in the Azerbaijan Premier League for Zira match against Sumgayit.

References

External links
 

1996 births
Living people
Association football midfielders
Azerbaijani footballers
Azerbaijan Premier League players
Zira FK players
Sabah FC (Azerbaijan) players
Sumgayit FK players
Sabail FK players